A group mind, group ego, mind coalescence, or gestalt intelligence in science fiction is a plot device in which multiple minds, or consciousnesses, are linked into a single, collective consciousness or intelligence. The first alien hive society was depicted in H. G. Wells's The First Men in the Moon (1901) while the use of human hive minds in literature goes back at least as far as David H. Keller's The Human Termites (published in Wonder Stories in 1929) and Olaf Stapledon's science fiction novel Last and First Men (1930), which is the first known use of the term "group mind" in science fiction. The use of the phrase "hive mind", however, was first recorded in 1943 in use in bee keeping and its first known use in sci-fi was James H. Schmitz's Second Night of Summer (1950). A group mind might be formed by any fictional plot device that facilitates brain to brain communication, such as telepathy.

This term may be used interchangeably with hive mind. "Hive mind" tends to describe a group mind in which the linked individuals have no identity or free will and are possessed or mind-controlled as extensions of the hive mind. It is frequently associated with the concept of an entity that spreads among individuals and suppresses or subsumes their consciousness in the process of integrating them into its own collective consciousness. The concept of the group or hive mind is an intelligent version of real-life superorganisms such as a beehive or an ant colony.

Some hive minds feature members that are controlled by a centralised "hive brain" or "hive queen" while others feature a decentralised approach where members interact equally or roughly equally to come to decisions. Hive minds are typically viewed in a negative light, especially in earlier works, though some newer works portray them as neutral or positive.

As conceived in speculative fiction, hive minds often imply (almost) complete loss (or lack) of individuality, identity, and personhood. The individuals forming the hive may specialize in different functions, similarly to social insects.


See also
Deindividuation
Global brain
Swarm intelligence
Technologically enabled telepathy
BCI synthetic telepathy/silent communication
Brain to brain communication

Further reading
Science Fiction and the Prediction of the Future: Essays on Foresight and Fallacy by Wong King Yuen, McFarland (2011)
The Greenwood Encyclopedia of Science Fiction and Fantasy: Themes, Works, and Wonders · Volume 3 by Gary Westfahl, Greenwood Press (2005)
Philosophers Look at Science Fiction by Nicholas D. Smith, Nelson-Hall (1982)
Science Fiction in Classic Rock: Musical Explorations of Space, Technology and the Imagination, 1967-1982 by Robert McParland, McFarland (2017)
Brave New Words : The Oxford Dictionary of Science Fiction by Jeff Brucher, Oxford University Press (2007)

References

External links
Entry on group mind at Science Fiction Citations
Miguel Nicolelis' Brain-net

Fictional collective consciousnesses
 
Science fiction themes
Collective intelligence